Ameixoeira was a Portuguese parish, located in the municipality of Lisbon. It had a population of 9,644 inhabitants and a total area of 1.62 km². With the 2012 Administrative Reform, the parish merged with the Charneca parish into a new one named Santa Clara.

References

External links

Ameixoeira heraldry

Former parishes of Lisbon